The Pink Book is an informal name for any of several books with pink covers. It may refer to: 

 The annual publication by the Office for National Statistics that details the United Kingdom's balance of payments
 Epidemiology and Prevention of Vaccine-Preventable Diseases, a book published by the US Centers for Disease Control and Prevention (14th edition, 2021)
 The member of the Coloured Book protocols family (1980–1992) that defined protocols for transport over Ethernet

See also
 Black Book (disambiguation)
 Blue book
Blue Book (disambiguation)
 Green Book (disambiguation)
 Orange Book (disambiguation)
 Plum Book
 White book (disambiguation)
 Yellow Book (disambiguation)